The Science Center for Education is a science museum in Khlong Toei District, Bangkok, Thailand. It is located next to the Eastern Bus Terminal (Ekkamai) on Sukhumvit Road, and is a science exhibition center. It includes an aquarium, a computer world, a planetarium, and workshops/devices intended for children.

History
The Science Center was established in 1992 by the merger of the Bangkok Planetarium which was established in 1964 and the Center for Educational Museum which was established in 1976.

Exhibitions 
The exhibition is divided into;

 The Planetarium hall – the semidome planetarium is the most popular permanent fixture at Bangkok Science Museum. There are presentations shown inside the hall with topics changing every 2 months.
 Exhibition hall 2 – exhibits the advancements of technologies in various fields, such as THEOS, Quickbird, Terra satellite, and more. 
 Exhibition hall 3 – exhibits aquatic life; rare fish, endangered fish, freshwater fish, and saltwater fish.
 Exhibition hall 4 – exhibits the Dinosaur exhibition, the World of Insects exhibition, the Strange Life exhibition, and more.

Many of the exhibits feature modern media and some include tests and experiments, with specific activity days available for students and the general public. Highlights include an interactive pirate ship, play supermarket and the world of insects, which are most popular with young children.

See also
National Science Museum (Thailand)

References

External links
Science Center for Education official website

Museums in Bangkok
Science museums in Thailand
Museums established in 1992
1992 establishments in Thailand